Derek Feldmann (born 6 October 1948) is a former Australian rules footballer who played with Melbourne and St Kilda in the Victorian Football League (VFL).

Notes

External links 

1948 births
Living people
Australian rules footballers from Victoria (Australia)
Melbourne Football Club players
St Kilda Football Club players